The 1914 season was the sixth season of Auckland Rugby League since its formation in 1909. It followed the 1913 Auckland Rugby League season where North Shore Albions were crowned senior champions for the first time. The senior grade saw the addition of Otahuhu Rovers, who had previously competed in the lower grades only, and Grafton Athletic. The Manukau Rovers and Eden Ramblers no longer contributed teams. The first grade was won once again by North Shore Albions.

    
    
    

At a meeting of Auckland Rugby League on 9 May it was decided that the proceeds of ticket sales at club games would be split 50–50 between the teams and Auckland Rugby League. Interest in the competition continued to grow with 5,000 attending the 3 senior matches played at Victoria Park on 20 June. There were 3,000 in attendance at the North Shore Albions game versus City Rovers in the Round 8 clash at the Devonport Domain. While 4,000 attended the Round 9 match between City Rovers and Ponsonby United at Victoria Park. There were 7,000 spectators for the final between North Shore Albions and Ponsonby United.

Whilst attendances were spectacular at times there were still signs that the competition was in its infancy with teams often playing one or more men short. The worst case being in the Round 9 match where Newton Rangers could only field eight players, with two spectators from the crowd later joining them as they were defeated by 43 points to 2 by North Shore Albions.

Near the conclusion of the season a match was played at Victoria Park between a team of veterans and Auckland colts on 29 August. It raised £27 and 10 shillings for the Patriotic Fund. Also a "Patriotic Carnival" was held on 5 September. A fancy dress carnival paraded around town with Highland pipers and a brass band. It proceeded to the Auckland Domain where a 3rd grade match was being played between Remuera and Ponsonby United 3rd Grade teams, and a ‘Burlesque’ football game was then played. Finally a match was played between the North Island Jockeys and Newton 3rd grade team which the jockey's won 11–6. £49 was raised for the Patriotic Fund.

Season news

Lower grade clubs 
Teams which fielded sides in lower grades were the Northcote Ramblers, Hobsonville Pirates, Sunnyside (based in Devonport), Remuera United and Manukau. The Sunnyside and Remuera United clubs were both new. The Sunnyside club would later amalgamate with North Shore Albions and form the Devonport United club, which later reverted back to the North Shore Albions name. While Remuera fielded sides in 1914 and 1915 before the war wrecked their playing ranks. They reformed again in 1927 but only lasted until the end of the 1929 season.

Representative season 
The Auckland representative campaign got underway with a match versus the touring England team where the home side lost. However the Auckland Rugby League made over £500 from the 13,000 in attendance. They also received £200 in gate takings from the match with Wellington at Victoria Park.

Myers Cup championship
After three weeks of practice in inclement weather the competition commenced on 16 May.

Myers Cup standings
The standings include the final between North Shore and Ponsonby won by North Shore by 13 points to 2.

Myers Cup fixtures

Round 1 
Otahuhu's beginning to senior rugby league got off to an inauspicious start when they began their match with just nine players. At halftime they were brought up to a full thirteen when substitutes arrived. Percy Williams who had previously represented Auckland at rugby union before being signed by Wigan where he played from 1910 to 1913 had returned to Auckland. He had played for New Zealand on their tour of Australia as a late addition mid tour. He turned out for the City Rovers and played his debut match against Otahuhu.

Round 2

Round 3

Round 4

Round 5 
In the match between Grafton and City both Albert Asher (City) and Bob Mitchell (Grafton) were ordered off. Fincham, a former Taranaki league representative scored a try for Grafton.

Round 6

Round 7 
George Gillett was granted a transfer from the Newton Rangers (where he was a life member) to the Ponsonby United club. The transfer needed the casting vote of the chairman before it was confirmed. He debuted for Ponsonby in their match with Otahuhu.

Round 8

Round 9 
In the match between Otahuhu and Grafton, M Stanaway, the Otahuhu captain was ordered off the field by referee Tyson. The match between North Shore and Newton was a farce with Newton only mustering 8 players. Two of the spectators joined the Newton team who were being trounced and the match finished 43 to 2 in favour of North Shore. The newspapers did not bother recording the point scorers though they did mention that the Shore side gave everybody in the team a chance to kick for goal.

Final

Top try scorers and point scorers
None of the North Shore point scorers from their farcical Round 9 match with Newton Rangers were credited and therefore the following lists will be inaccurate as 43 points were scored by them. Of note in the point scoring lists is the prodigious scoring of Karl Ifwersen with 66 points. Indeed, Grafton only scored 75 points in total.

Lower grades
Northcote & Birkenhead Ramblers were awarded the second grade championship after August 8 as they were so far ahead of the trailing teams. The fourth grade competition was terminated early owing to so many of its players enlisting in the military forces. Whilst the draws were published in the New Zealand Herald and Auckland Star each Thursday, the results were only intermittently reported in the same newspapers on the Monday following games. On June 20 the Auckland Star gave the standings in all grades ot that point so these tables have been pieced together from those standings and later reported results. As such the standings are incomplete though roughly accurate. Grades were made of the following teams with the winning team in bold.
Second Grade: City Rovers, Grafton, Newton Rangers, North Shore Albions, Northcote & Birkenhead Ramblers, Otahuhu Rovers, Ponsonby United
Third Grade: City Rovers, Hobsonville Pirates, Manukau, Sunnyside A, Sunnyside B, Newton Rangers, North Shore Albions, Grafton Athletic, Otahuhu Rovers, City Rovers, Ponsonby United, Remuera United
Fourth Grade: City Rovers, Otahuhu Rovers A, Otahuhu Rovers B, North Shore Albions, Sunnyside, Ponsonby United, Manukau A, Manukau B, Grafton Athletic A, Grafton Athletic B, Remuera United, Newton Rangers

Second grade standings
Sunnyside defaulted their first match against Northcote and then withdrew from the competition. Northcote were given 2 competition points for the default but as no other side had the opportunity to play them those points were disallowed.
{|
|-
|

Third grade standings
{|
|-
|

Fourth grade standings
{|
|-
|

Representative fixtures
Auckland began the representative season with a match with the touring England side who were on their first ever tour of New Zealand. Film footage exists of the match and is archived on the New Zealand Archive of Film, television and Sound Ngā Taonga website. Auckland was defeated 34–12 in front of 13,000 paying spectators at the Auckland Domain which allowed Auckland Rugby League to collect £519 and 2 shillings.

Auckland v England

Auckland v Waikato (Northern Union Cup)

Auckland B v Rotorua

Auckland v Taranaki (Northern Union Cup)

Auckland v Wellington (Northern Union Cup)

Auckland representative matches played and scorers 
The following list includes the 4 matches that the Auckland A team played and excludes the Auckland B team match.

References

External links
 Auckland Rugby League Official Site

Auckland Rugby League seasons
Auckland Rugby League